Marevy is a rural locality (a settlement) in Marevsky Selsoviet of Tyndinsky District, Amur Oblast, Russia. The population was 599 as of 2018. There are four streets.

Geography 
Marevy is located on the Gilyuy River, 95 km east of Tynda (the district's administrative centre) by road. Bestuzhevo is the nearest rural locality.

References 

Rural localities in Tyndinsky District